Ngulu is a Bantu language spoken in east-central Tanzania. In 1987 the Ngulu-speaking population was estimated to number 132,000 . The Ngulu language is also called Geja, Kingulu, Nguru, Nguu, or Wayomba.

References

Languages of Tanzania
Northeast Coast Bantu languages